The VM reactor (Russian: вм реаҝтор) is type of various series of nuclear pressurized water reactors (PWR). They were used singly or in pairs to power the Soviet Navy's submarines. 

It was developed by NIKIET.

Series 

 The VM-A reactor was the nuclear fission reactor used in pairs to power the Soviet Navy's Project 658 and 701, Project 659 and 675, and Project 627 Кит first-generation submarines. It was a pressurized water reactor (PWR), using 20% enriched uranium-235 fuel to produce  of power.  This is the reactor that powered . 
 The VM-4 reactor is a nuclear fission reactor using 20% enriched uranium-235 fuel to produce  of power. It is used:
 singly to power the Project 670 Скат and Чайка-Б submarines
 in pairs to power the Project 671 Ёрш and Щука, Project 667 Мурена, Кальмар, and Дельфин, and Project 667 Навага, Налим, Груша, and Андромеда second-generation submarines.  
 The VM-5 reactor was the nuclear fission reactor used in a pair to power the Soviet Navy's Project 661 Анчар - Anchar second-generation submarine.  It was a pressurized water reactor (PWR) using enriched uranium-235 fuel to produce  of power.

External links

 

Soviet naval reactors
Pressurized water reactors